My Fabulous Gay Wedding is a Canadian reality show hosted by comedian Scott Thompson in the first season and Elvira Kurt in the second. The series airs on the Global Television Network. It is broadcast in the U.S. as First Comes Love, on Logo.

In the first season, the show features a same-sex couple that plans to marry; the arrangements for the wedding are prepared, on two weeks' notice, by a team of wedding planners who are both heterosexual and homosexual. As with typical, Western heterosexual weddings, the general idea is to create a unique experience that reflects the personality of the people to be wed, while adding a special gay sensibility. The spirit of the program is one of fun.

In the second season, with new host Elvira Kurt, the stories concentrate more on the couples than the wedding planning process. The team of wedding planners has been reduced to one: Fern Cohen. This season debuted on Logo in February 2007.

Through interviews with the family members, the show also explores the issue of same-sex marriage and its effect on the social fabric.

External links
First Comes Love series page on Logo

Official Blog

Global Television Network original programming
2005 Canadian television series debuts
2000s LGBT-related reality television series
2000s Canadian reality television series
Television series by Entertainment One
2000s Canadian LGBT-related television series
Canadian dating and relationship reality television series
Same-sex marriage in Canada
Canadian LGBT-related reality television series